Group 4 consisted of four of the 32 teams entered into the European zone: Belgium, Iceland, Netherlands, and Northern Ireland. These four teams competed on a home-and-away basis for one of the 8.5 spots in the final tournament allocated to the European zone. The spot would be assigned to the group's winner.

Standings

Matches

Notes

External links 
Group 4 Detailed Results at RSSSF

4
1976–77 in Belgian football
1977–78 in Belgian football
1976–77 in Dutch football
1977–78 in Dutch football
1976 in Icelandic football
1977 in Icelandic football
1976–77 in Northern Ireland association football
1977–78 in Northern Ireland association football